('game of Provence'; also known as , "boules of Lyon") is a  French form of boules.

In Italy, the sport , which is played with bronze balls, follows a similar set of rules.

History
The current version of the game developed during the 18th century around the area of Lyon.

 The  was formed in 1906.  
 About the same time, in 1907, the sport of  split off to become its own sport.

Rules

The rules are similar to the game of  except that: 
 A  court is about twice the size of a  court.
 In , the normal practice is to take a short run-up to the throw. (In , the feet are fixed in one spot while throwing.)

These differences reflect the reason that  was invented – to create a sport that was accessible to a disabled player in a wheelchair.

In addition:

Grounds and equipment

Boules

The boules vary in size, weight, and composition, usually to accommodate the player's comfort, but tend to be made of bronze (with the jack being wooden) and are usually  in diameter and weigh . They must be centrally balanced.

References

External links
 Fédération Internationale de Pétanque et Jeu Provençal web site
 BocceVolo.com - World Class Bocce
 Confederation Mondiale des Sports de Boules
 Fédération Internationale de Boules (FIB)
 Bocce in Volo - La community boccistica della specialità volo italiana (Portale e forum sulle bocce italiane e mondiali) 
 A short video showing Jeu Provençal being played
 sport-boules in French Wikipedia

Ball games
Boules
Culture of Auvergne-Rhône-Alpes
Sports originating in France
Lawn games